Knatts Valley is a hamlet situated in the West Kingsdown civil parish in the county of Kent, England.

It was originally a rural community consisting mainly of several smallholdings: the principal farms being Knatts Farm (sheep), giving its name to the area; and Maplescombe Farm (cattle). One settlement in the valley is Romney Street; the word street meaning hamlet in these parts of Kent.
To the east there is a development of housing within a wooded area, mainly of detached housing, and to the west is a similar development — "East Hill". There is a golf course and a residential caravan park. Here is also an unlicensed airstrip, being part of Romney Street Farm, with a north–south grass runway east of Upper Wood.

Villages in Kent
Sevenoaks District